Vincent Meilleur (born 6 May 1974) is a French ski mountaineer. He was born in Moûtier.

Selected results 
 1998:
 2nd, European Cup
 2nd, Grand Béal race
 3rd, French Championship
 1999:
 8th, European Championship
 2000:
 3rd, European Cup
 2001:
 2nd, European Championship team race (together with Cédric Tomio)
 2nd, European Cup
 2nd, French Championship
 3rd, Trophée des Gastlosen (European Cup, together with Cédric Tomio)
 2002: 
 1st, Trophée des Gastlosen (together with Cédric Tomio)
 6th, World Championship team race (together with Cédric Tomio)
 2003:
 8th, European Championship team race (together with Cédric Tomio)
 2004:
 6th, World Championship team race (together with Cédric Tomio)
 2005:
 4th, European Championship team race (together with Bertrand Blanc)

Pierra Menta 

 1997: 5th, together with Jean-Michel Bouvier
 1998: 5th, together with Jérôme Arpin
 1999: 6th, together with Jérôme Arpin
 2000: 7th, together with Jean Pellissier
 2001: 3rd, together with Cédric Tomio
 2002: 4th, together with Cédric Tomio
 2003: 3rd, together with Cédric Tomio
 2004: 2nd, together with Cédric Tomio
 2005: 5th, together with Bertrand Blanc
 2006: 5th, together with Bertrand Blanc
 2007: 4th, together with William Bon Mardion

Notes

External links 
 Vincent Meilleur at SkiMountaineering.org

1974 births
Living people
French male ski mountaineers
21st-century French people
20th-century French people